The Zeitschrift für katholische Theologie was a quarterly peer-reviewed academic journal established in 1877 at the Faculty of Theology at the University of Innsbruck. It was associated with the Society of Jesus. The journal published its last independent issue in 2020. With the beginning of 2021 the journal merged with the journal Theologie und Philosophie to form the Zeitschrift für Theologie und Philosophie.

The journal aims to promote ecumenical discussion in the spirit of the Second Vatican Council. It is accessible through JSTOR and abstracted and indexed in the ATLA Religion Database and Scopus.

References

External links

German-language journals
Jesuit publications
Publications established in 1877
Quarterly journals
Catholic studies journals
University of Innsbruck
1877 establishments in Austria-Hungary